Hwata is a Senatorial constituency in the Senate of Zimbabwe. It covers the following parliamentary constituencies in the House of Assembly of Zimbabwe and which are situated in the west of Harare.Hwata is one of six senatorial constituencies in Harare province.
This senate seat was named after the Hwata Dynasty which was founded by Shayachimwe in the 19th century. The Hwata family resided at Barapata Hill in present-day Mufakose, a suburb of Harare.Chief Hwata Chiripanyanga worked with  Nehanda Nyakasikana in organising resistance against white settlers in his lands in June 1896.In what has been described as the First Chimurenga (war of liberation), Hwata lost 100 men who were killed by white settlers under the command of Captain Nisbert of the Mazoe Patrol.

 Budiriro
 Glen Norah
 Glen View
 Mufakose
 Highfield East 
 Highfield West
 Kambuzuma
 Dzivarasekwa
 Kuwadzana

In the 2008 election, the constituency elected MDC member Rorana Muchihwa as senator. He beat an MDC rival faction member Mavis Musinami, ZANU PF member (and former Mayor of Harare) Charles Tawengwa and independent candidate Kambeve Tinei. 

Under the Zimbabwe Youth Council, Hwata has also had Junior Senators in office to meet the administration of its children.  In 2013 a Mufakose 1 High student by the name of Jerrial managed to ascend to the position of Hwata Jr Senator after having out done 25 other students from different schools in a public speaking campaign contest.  In 2014, after his term of office,  it was Allan Chawandika of Highfield 2 High who succeed him after having been outstanding as well in the juniors campaign.  The junior senatorial post in 2015 was seized by Takudzwa Falanela of Mufakose 1 High School again who reigned victorious after a fierce public speaking competition in which he contested alongside 28 other prospectives.

Harare
Senate of Zimbabwe